Canton was an American basketball team based in Canton, Ohio that was a member of the Central Basketball League. The team replaced the Homestead Young Americans during the 1906/07 Postseason Series.

Year-by-year

References

Sports in Canton, Ohio
Basketball teams in Ohio